Cyperus hillebrandii, commonly known as Hillebrand's flatsedge, is a species of sedge that is endemic to Hawaii.

The species was first formally described by the botanist Johann Otto Boeckeler in 1880.

It has two subspecies:
 Cyperus hillebrandii subsp. decipiens
 Cyperus hillebrandii subsp. hillebrandii

See also 
 List of Cyperus species

References 

hillebrandii
Taxa named by Johann Otto Boeckeler
Plants described in 1880
Flora of Hawaii